"A Christmas Duel" is a special Christmas duet recorded by the Swedish rock band The Hives and American singer-songwriter Cyndi Lauper. It was available as a single on November 19, 2008. It debuted at No. 6 on the Swedish Singles Charts published on December 28, and has since reached a peak at No. 4. It was released as a vinyl one-sided 7", a CD 5" single, and as download (all in Sweden only).

The song juxtaposes "really sweet music and nasty lyrics". As for how the collaboration took place, The Hives' lead singer Pelle Almqvist stated: "We came up with the song and we figured it was a duet, and we'd always hoped to do a duet with Cyndi Lauper."

"A Christmas Duel" also appears on NO HO HO: Alternative Christmas Holiday Anthems, released on November 10, 2009.

References

The Hives songs
Cyndi Lauper songs
2008 singles
American Christmas songs
2008 songs